The 2012 season was Perak's 9th consecutive season in the Malaysian Super League.

Players

First team squad

Transfers

In

First transfer window

Second transfer window

Out

First transfer window

Second transfer window

Loan in

* The players loaned in for Malaysia Cup campaign only.

Competitions

Super League

League table

FA Cup

The draw was held on 13 December 2011 at Wisma FAM.

Malaysia Cup

Group stage

Statistics

Top scorers
The list is sorted by shirt number when total goals are equal.
{| class="wikitable sortable" style="font-size: 95%; text-align: center;"
|-
!width=10|
!width=10|
!width=10|
!width=150|Player
!width=50|Super League
!width=50|FA Cup
!width=50|Malaysia Cup
!width=50|Total
|-
|1
|FW
|25
|align=left| Michal Kubala
|13||1||0||14
|-
|2
|FW
|9
|align=left| Albert Bodjongo
|7||0||2||9
|-
|3
|FW
|14
|align=left| Akmal Rizal
|5||0||0||5
|-
|rowspan="4"|4
|MF
|7
|align=left| Fahrul Razi
|2||0||1||3
|-
|MF
|10
|align=left| Nazri Kamal
|1||0||2||3
|-
|-
|MF
|16
|align=left| Fazrul Hazli
|2||0||1||3
|-
|MF
|20
|align=left| Rafiuddin Rodin
|3||0||0||3
|-
|rowspan="2"|8
|DF
|5
|align=left| Shahrom Kalam
|1||0||1||2
|-
|FW
|18
|align=left| Shafiq Jamal
|2||0||0||2
|-
|rowspan="2"|9
|FW
|9
|align=left| Lazar Popović
|1||0||0||1
|-
|FW
|12
|align=left| Failee Ghazli
|1||0||0||1
|-
|#
|colspan="3"|Own goals  
|2
|0
|0
|0 
|-class="sortbottom"
|colspan=4|Total
|40
|1
|7
|48

References

Perak F.C. seasons
Perak FA